Rubey may refer to:

Dorsa Rubey, wrinkle ridge system in Oceanus Procellarum on the Moon
Rubey Glacier, broad, heavily crevassed glacier flowing north to coalesce with the west side of Hull Glacier east of Mount Giles, near the coast of Marie Byrd Land

Given name:
Rubey M. Hulen (1894–1956), Boone County prosecutor, nominated to the federal bench by President Franklin D. Roosevelt
Rubey Mosley Hulen (1894–1956), United States federal judge

Surname:
Thomas L. Rubey (1862–1928), U.S. Representative from Missouri
William Walden Rubey (1898–1974), American geologist